Kraepelin is a surname. Notable people with the surname include:

 Emil Kraepelin (1856–1926), German psychiatrist
 Karl Kraepelin (1848–1915), German naturalist